Once a Year, Every Year  (Italian: Tutti gli anni una volta l'anno)  is a 1994 Italian comedy film written and directed by Gianfrancesco Lazotti.

Cast 
 Giorgio Albertazzi: Lorenzo 
 Paolo Bonacelli: Romano 
 Lando Buzzanca: Mario 
 Paolo Ferrari: Francesco 
 Paola Pitagora: Ginerva 
 Giovanna Ralli: Laura 
 Jean Rochefort: Raffaele 
 Vittorio Gassman: Giuseppe 
 Gianmarco Tognazzi: Davide 
 Alexandra La Capria: Giulia 
 Carla Cassola: Annamaria 
 Mariangela Giordano 
 Luigi Bonos

References

External links

1994 films
1994 comedy films
Italian comedy films
Films about old age
1990s Italian films